= Panchawa =

- village
- Location within Madhya Pradesh Location within India
- Coordinates: 23.0903028°N 77.4400774°E
- Country: India
- State: Madhya Pradesh
- District: Bhopal
- Tehsil: Huzur
- Elevation: 456 m (1,496 ft)

Population (2011)
  - Total: 196
- Time zone: UTC+5:30 (IST)
- ISO 3166 code: MP-IN
- 2011 census code: 482543

Panchawa is a village in the Bhopal district of Madhya Pradesh, India. It is located in the Huzur tehsil and the Phanda block.

== Demographics ==
According to the 2011 census of India, Panchawa has 41 households. The effective literacy rate (i.e. the literacy rate of population excluding children aged 6 and below) is 71.69%.

Demographics (2011 Census)
| | Total | Male | Female |
|---|---|---|---|
| Population | 196 | 92 | 104 |
| Children aged below 6 years | 30 | 12 | 18 |
| Scheduled caste | 9 | 5 | 4 |
| Scheduled tribe | 0 | 0 | 0 |
| Literates | 119 | 67 | 52 |
| Workers (all) | 103 | 54 | 49 |
| Main workers (total) | 69 | 47 | 22 |
| Main workers: Cultivators | 29 | 19 | 10 |
| Main workers: Agricultural labourers | 28 | 17 | 11 |
| Main workers: Household industry workers | 0 | 0 | 0 |
| Main workers: Other | 12 | 11 | 1 |
| Marginal workers (total) | 34 | 7 | 27 |
| Marginal workers: Cultivators | 14 | 2 | 12 |
| Marginal workers: Agricultural labourers | 18 | 5 | 13 |
| Marginal workers: Household industry workers | 0 | 0 | 0 |
| Marginal workers: Others | 2 | 0 | 2 |
| Non-workers | 93 | 38 | 55 |
